The Central Political and Legal Affairs Commission or CPLC, commonly referred to as Zhongyang Zhengfawei (中央政法委, literally "Central Poli-Legal Commission") in Chinese, is the organization under the Central Committee of the Chinese Communist Party (CCP) responsible for "political and legal affairs". Based on the principles of Leninism and democratic centralism, the organization acts as the overseer and coordinator of all legal enforcement authorities, including the Ministries of State Security, Public Security and Justice, as well as the Supreme People's Court and Supreme People's Procuratorate. All the CCP committees of provinces, municipalities, counties and autonomous regions establish respective politics and law commissions.

The CPLC functions as "the general chief of staff of the party committees, and represents the party in overseeing the country’s intelligence, law enforcement, judicial, and to a lesser extent, lawmaking systems". Its control of China's justice system has been especially useful and important for the Communist Party since the beginning of Chinese economic reform, because the CPLC has consistently and successfully acted, through judges and prosecutors, to seize the assets and imprison those businesspeople who were becoming economically powerful enough to acquire a base independent from that of the party.

The commission is headed by a secretary who is usually a CCP Politburo member.

History
The commission was preceded by a Politics and Law Leading Group (政法领导小组; Zhèngfǎ Lǐngdǎo Xiǎozǔ) which was set up in 1958, with Peng Zhen as its leader. During the Cultural Revolution it was led by Ji Dengkui, who served as group leader until 24 January 1980, when the commission was established, with Peng Zhen back as its secretary.

In 1988, the commission was downgraded to a small leading group. This was part of the result of efforts by reformist Zhao Ziyang to separate the CCP from state institutions. The Small Leading Group on Political and Legal Affairs focused on a narrower set of policy and research concerns, and did not take as active a role intervening in cases or issuing directives, resulting in a degree of increased independence of the judiciary. The crisis precipitated by the 1989 Tiananmen Square protests and massacre resulted in a reversal of these reforms, and the Small Group was reverted to its Commission status in March 1990, with the goal of maintaining stability through tighter control of public security and legal systems.

After the 18th National Congress of the CCP in 2012, Meng Jianzhu replaced Zhou Yongkang as the head of the  commission. However, Meng, unlike Zhou, was not elected to the 18th CCP Politburo Standing Committee. The apparent downgrading of the post followed Zhou's connection with the Wang Lijun incident, which has discredited Chongqing politician Bo Xilai's method of using the internal security apparatus for political ends. As a result, the independence of the judiciary in China increased. Reforms under CCP general secretary Xi Jinping emphasizing simultaneous need for rule of law and stability have subsequently affected the commission. The commission now has a more policy-and-research oriented focus, although the CCP still maintains control over the legal system.

In May 2021, the commission was criticized for posting an image on Sina Weibo of a rocket launch in China next to a photo of mass cremations in India as a result of the COVID-19 pandemic.

In 2021, it was reported that the commission operates a predictive policing system against Uyghurs and others.

List of heads

Leaders of the Central Political and Law Group 
 Peng Zhen (1958)
 Luo Ruiqing (1958–1960)
 Xie Fuzhi (1960–1966)
 Ji Dengkui (1969–1980)

Secretaries of the Central Politics and Legal Affairs Commission 
 Peng Zhen (1980–1982)
 Chen Pixian (1982–1985)
 Qiao Shi (1985–1992)
 Ren Jianxin (1992–1998)
 Luo Gan (1998–2007)
 Zhou Yongkang (2007–2012)
 Meng Jianzhu (2012–2017)
 Guo Shengkun (2017–2022)
 Chen Wenqing (2022-)

Corruption charges against past secretaries 

In 2013 and 2014, the Politburo of the CCP Central Committee held meetings to hear the findings of an investigation against Zhou Yongkang and, in June 2015, Zhou was found guilty of accepting bribes, abuse of power, intentionally leaking state secrets for which his private possessions were confiscated and he was sentenced to life in prison. Zhou is among the most senior and powerful Chinese leaders to be jailed in CCP general secretary Xi Jinping's crackdown. Zhou's wife and son were jailed for graft charges and his nephew, Zhou Feng, was fined 59 million yuan (approximately $9 million USD).

Current composition 
 Secretary
 Chen Wenqing, Member of the 20th Politburo, Secretary of the Central Secretariat, Minister of State Security

 Deputy Secretary
 Wang Xiaohong, Minister of Public Security

 Members
 Chief Justice Zhou Qiang, President of the Supreme People's Court (sub-national-leader-level)
 Chief Prosecutor Zhang Jun, Procurator-General of the Supreme People's Procuratorate (sub-national-leader-level)
 Chen Yixin, Secretary-General of the Central Political and Legal Affairs Commission (minister-level)
 He Rong, Minister of Justice
 PLA Vice Admiral Wang Renhua, Secretary of the Political and Legal Affairs Commission of the Central Military Commission
 PAP General Wang Chunning, Commander of the People's Armed Police

References

External links 

 

Institutions of the Central Committee of the Chinese Communist Party
1980 establishments in China